Ganjuwa is a Local Government Area of Bauchi State, Nigeria. It was curved out from the Darazo Local Government in September, 1991 and it's bordered with Jigawa State from the North and Gombe State from the South East. The Local Government also shares border with the following Local Governments: - Bauchi Local Government from the South, Toro Local Government from the West, Ningi Local Government from the North West, Darazo Local Government from the North South East and Kirfi Local Government from the East.

Based on the 2006 Population Census figure, the Local Government has 280,486 population with numerous tribes/languages, but prominent among them are Gerawa, Denawa, Miyawa, Kariyawa, Hausawa, Fulanis among others. Ganjuwa Local Government now has one District, eight Village Areas and 122 Hamlets. The Madaki of Bauchi is the District Head of Ganjuwa, and the King maker of the Bauchi Emirate.

Its headquarters are in the town of Kafin Madaki forty-seven kilometers from the State Capital along Kano Road. The most urban towns of the Local Government are Kafin Madaki at the centre being the Local Government Administrative Headquarter, Soro from the East, Miya from the West. 
 
It has an area of 5,059 km²

Religion
Ganjuwa is predominantly Muslim, along with Christian and traditional religions.

Educational Institutions
Ten Post Primary Institutions, Government Girls’ College Kafin Madaki (Special School), Government Day Secondary School each at Kafin Madaki, Miya, Nassarawa, Yali, Sabon Kariya, Zalanga and Gungura. Government Secondary School Soro and Technical College, Kafin, Madaki.

Commercial and Industrial Activities
Some few cottage industries exist in rural area's like soap making, knitting, weaving established by some women groups and bakery, bricks moulding, block moulding, semi industry poultry, etc.

Local Generated Revenue
An average of N879, 769:00 Monthly is generated mostly from Markets.

The postal code of the area is 742.

References

Local Government Areas in Bauchi State